Bourne Bridge railway station served Little Abington, Great Abington, Pampisford and Babraham in Cambridgeshire. It closed in 1851, along with its line, which was one of the earliest line closures in England.

The site of the station was taken over for the construction of the Railway Inn public house. It is believed that the abandoned station was reconstructed around ten years after closure when it reopened as an inn to capitalise on the newly opened Pampisford railway station. What is more, it appears that approximately one-quarter to one-third of the inn comprised the actual brickwork of the station.

References

External links
 Bourne Bridge station at disused-stations.org

Disused railway stations in Cambridgeshire
Former Great Eastern Railway stations
Railway stations in Great Britain opened in 1848
Railway stations in Great Britain closed in 1851
1848 establishments in England